Dement Township is one of twenty-four townships in Ogle County, Illinois, USA.  As of the 2010 census, its population was 989 and it contained 409 housing units.

History
Dement Township was formed from the east half of Flagg Township on September 11, 1855. The township was named for John Dement (1804–1883), politician and militia commander from Illinois.

Geography
It contains the village of Creston, and the east side of the city of Rochelle.

Cemeteries
The township contains Woodlawn Cemetery.

Demographics

Political districts
 Illinois's 16th congressional district
 State House District 70
 State Senate District 35

References
 
 United States Census Bureau 2009 TIGER/Line Shapefiles
 United States National Atlas

External links
 City-Data.com
 Illinois State Archives
 Township Officials of Illinois
 Midwest Government Info

Townships in Ogle County, Illinois
Townships in Illinois
1855 establishments in Illinois